is a song recorded by Japanese singer songwriter Mai Kuraki. It was written by Kuraki and Taisuke Nakamura. The song is set to be released through Northern Music on March 20, 2019, as a double-A side maxi single with "Barairo no Jinsei". The single was released as a digital single and in five physical editions: standard edition, limited edition A/B, Detective Conan edition, and Musing &  edition. The song was served as the theme song to the Japanese animation Case Closed.

Promotion

Meet and greet events
In support of the single, Kuraki embarked on the ten-leg meet and greet events. At the tour, Kuraki sang several song and went on to hand her merchandise, mini calendar, to the audiences. Fans were also allowed to do high-fives with her.

Commercial performance 
"Kimi to Koi no Mama de Owarenai Itsumo Yume no Mama ja Irarenai"/"Barairo no Jinsei" debuted on the Oricon Daily Singles Chart at number five. In its second day, the single climbed to number two, behind "Uchōten Shooter" by Matsuri Nine. The single debuted at number four on the Oricon Weekly Singles Chart, selling 23,380 physical copies in its first week. The single became Kuraki's 42nd top ten single, extending her record as the artist with the most consecutive top ten singles in Japan since the debut.

Music video 
The short version of an accompanying music video for the song was premiered on Kuraki's YouTube account on February 20, 2019.
The full version of the video was not released on YouTube; will be included only in the DVD accompanied with the limited edition A of the single.

Live performance 
Kuraki first performed "Kimi to Koi no Mama de Owarenai Itsumo Yume no Mama ja Irarenai", alongside "Barairo no Jinsei", at the meet and greet event on January 20, 2019. She also sang the song at the wedding ceremony of the employee of Samantha Thavasa, as a part of the company's 25th anniversary campaigns.

Kuraki's first televised performance of "Kimi to Koi no Mama de Owarenai Itsumo Yume no Mama ja Irarenai" was at the "Premier Melodix!" on March 18, 2019.

Media usage 
In December 2018, it was announced that "Kimi to Koi no Mama de Owarenai Itsumo Yume no Mama ja Irarenai" would serve as a theme song to The Scarlet School Trip, the special episodes of the Japanese animated television series Detective Conan, in which Kuraki also appeared as a voice actor. Later, it was determined that the song would also serve as a theme song to the web television series FHit Music.

Track listing

Charts

Certification and sales

|-
! scope="row"| Japan (RIAJ)
| 
| 37,291 
|-
|}

Release history

References

2019 singles
2019 songs
Mai Kuraki songs
Songs written by Mai Kuraki
Case Closed songs
Song recordings produced by Daiko Nagato